The Karo Hills are rounded, ice-free foothills extending for  along the west side of the terminus of Scott Glacier, from Mount Salisbury north-northwest to the edge of the Ross Ice Shelf. They were first seen and roughly mapped by the Byrd Antarctic Expedition, 1928–30, and were named by the Advisory Committee on Antarctic Names for Admiral H. Arnold Karo, Director of the U.S. Coast and Geodetic Survey, 1955–65.

References

Hills of Antarctica
Amundsen Coast